Billy Little (born 3 February 1940) in Dumfries is a Scottish former professional association footballer and manager best known for his time at Aberdeen.

Playing career

Little joined Aberdeen in 1957, having played for Scottish School boys defeat of England schools at Parkhead in that year. He made over 300 appearances for Aberdeen, scoring 98 goals over 12 years. While at Aberdeen Little was a Scottish League and under 23 internationalist. Little moved to Australia in 1969. He returned to Scotland a year later, signing for Highland Football League Club, Inverness Caledonian FC. He then moved back into the Scottish League and had spells with Falkirk, Stirling Albion, East Stirlingshire and Alloa Athletic.

Management

Little managed Falkirk and hometown club Queen of the South. It was he who as Queen's manager signed Jimmy Robertson for the Palmerston Park club.

Career statistics

Club 
Appearances and goals by club, season and competition

Managerial record

Honours
East Stirlingshire
Stirlingshire Cup : 1984-85

References

1940 births
Living people
Association football forwards
Scottish footballers
Aberdeen F.C. players
Falkirk F.C. players
Stirling Albion F.C. players
East Stirlingshire F.C. players
Scottish Football League players
Scottish football managers
Falkirk F.C. managers
Queen of the South F.C. managers
East Stirlingshire F.C. managers
Alloa Athletic F.C. managers
Footballers from Dumfries
Caledonian F.C. players
Scottish Football League managers